The KwaZulu-Natal National Botanical Garden is situated along Mayor's Walk, in the western suburbs of Pietermaritzburg, South Africa. 
The identification code of the KwaZulu-Natal National Botanical Garden as a member of the Botanic Gardens Conservation International (BGCI), as well as the initials of its herbarium is NBGN .

History 
It was established in 1874. Plants from eastern South Africa and from the Northern Hemisphere are cultivated here. The garden is open every day of the year, from 8am to 6pm in summer, and from 8am to 5.30pm in winter. sure

It features a century-old lane of plane trees, leading northwards from the entrance, and a forested hillside with a number of footpaths. The Dorpspruit, a tributary of the Msunduze River, flows at the base of the hillside.

The garden is one of the oldest in the world, and in 2015, it was announced that it would be given an upgrade and a new lease on life.

See also
List of botanical gardens in South Africa

References

External links
 
KwaZulu-Natal National Botanical Garden, SA tourism
KwaZulu-Natal National Botanical Garden, sanbi

Botanical gardens in South Africa
Geography of KwaZulu-Natal
Tourist attractions in KwaZulu-Natal